Events in the year 1845 in India.

Events
 1st Sikh War, 1845–46.
Grant Medical College opened in Bombay

Law
Meriah Sacrifices Act
Governor General Act

Deaths
 Daya Shankar Kaul Nasim, poet (born 1811).

References

 
India
Years of the 19th century in India